Ernst Rifgatovich Muldashev (born on January 1, 1948, Verkhne-Sermenevo, Beloretsky District, Bashkir Autonomous Soviet Socialist Republic, USSR), Russian surgeon ophthalmologist, general director of the All-Russian Center for Ophthalmic and Plastic Surgery in the city of Ufa, author of esoteric books.

Biography 
Ernst Muldashev was born on January 1, 1948, in the village of Verkhne-Sermenevo, Beloretsky District,  of the Bashkir Autonomous Soviet Socialist Republic. He is the son of Bashkir Rifgat Iskandarovich Muldashev and Ukrainian Valentina Kirsanovna Makhini, brother of Albert Rifgatovich Muldashev and Eduard Rifgatovich Muldashev. From 1955 to 1965 Muldashev studied at the school (First Lyceum) of the city of Salavat.

From 1972 to 1982 he worked as a researcher, head of the department of reconstructive and plastic surgery at the Ufa Research Institute of Eye Diseases. From 1982 to 1988, Muldashev worked as an ophthalmologist in the eye department of Hospital No.10, MSCh OLUNPZ. From 1988 to 1990, he held the position of head of the transplant laboratory for ophthalmic surgery of MNTK "Eye Microsurgery". From 1990, he was a director of the All-Russian Center for Ophthalmic and Plastic Surgery (Ufa).

He is the author of more than 50 Russian patents for inventions and utility models, 10 foreign patents, more than 300 scientific publications, including 7 monographs:
 Staphylomas of sclera, 2000.
 Surgery of the liver and biliary tract, 2005.
 Complicated glaucoma, 2005.
 Social and biomedical aspects of tissue transplantation, 2007.
 Revelations of the surgeon. As I did the world's first eye transplant, 2010.
 Are we correct for glaucoma, 2013.
 Regenerative medicine. Alloplant biomaterials in ophthalmic surgery, 2014.

Master of Sports of the USSR, three-time champion of the USSR in sports tourism. One of the organizers and participants of the expeditions to verify the version of the crash of the missing aircraft of S. A. Levanevsky in 1937 in Yakutia.

He has been a member of the Congress of People's Deputies in the early 90s.

Personal life 
He married Tatyana Muldasheva.

Ophthalmology 
Muldashev is an Honored Doctor of the Russian Federation, Doctor of Medical Sciences, Professor. Member of the Board of the Society of Ophthalmologists of Russia. Surgeon of the highest category, honorary consultant at the University of Louisville (USA), a member of the American Academy of Ophthalmology, a certified ophthalmologist in Mexico, a member of the International Academy of Sciences. According to him, he has published more than 400 scientific works, conducts 600-800 eye operations annually.

Muldashev commercialized surgical techniques using a material made from cartilage from deceased donors he calls Alloplant. He claims this material, surgically implanted in the eye, will help cure or stop the progression of a vast array of diseases and conditions, such as retinitis pigmentosa, diabetic retinopathy, age-related macular degeneration, optic nerve atrophy, glaucoma, progressive myopia and retinopathy of prematurity.
Expert ophthalmologists contacted by the media say scientific literature include no studies validating Muldashev's claims about Alloplant.

Pseudohistory 
Muldashev is the author of books on mysticism, presenting pseudoscientific theories relating to the origin of humanity.

The gene pool of mankind, according to Muldashev, is a hypothetical formation, which is a collection of somati caves located mainly in the Himalayas, in which people of previous civilizations are in a "preserved" state (somati or samadhi).

To finally unravel the secrets of this mystical country of Shambhala, an expedition of Russian scientists and climbers went to Tibet. The participants of the expedition RATT (Russian Adventure Travel Team), organized by the Russian Geographical Society with the support of Komsomolskaya Pravda, examined the area of Mount Kailash, under which an underground country is supposedly located. Scientists went up to the almost inaccessible “door to Shambhala”, examined the “stone laser”, and visited the mysterious “Death Valley”. Unfortunately, no miracles were found. All these artifacts, which Ernst Muldashev painted so colorfully in his books, are of absolutely natural origin.

Awards and honors 

 Bronze medal of the Exhibition of Economic Achievements of the USSR, 1986;
 "Honored Doctor of the Russian Federation", 1998;
 Order of Salavat Yulaev - State Award of the Republic of Bashkortostan, 2000;
 Medal "For outstanding services to national health care”, 2001;
 Order of Friendship of Peoples, 2007.

Publications

Books 

 В поисках Города Богов. Том 1. Трагическое послание древних. (2002) 544 стр. Тираж: 50000. ;
 В поисках Города Богов. Том 2. Золотые пластины Харати (2002);
 В поисках Города Богов. Том 3. В объятиях Шамбалы. (2002) 528 стр. Тираж: 3000. ;
 В поисках Города Богов. Том 4. Предисловие к Матрице жизни на Земле (2002);
 В поисках Города Богов. Том 5. Матрица Жизни на Земле (2002);
 Трагическое послание древних;
 В объятиях Шамбалы;
 Золотые пластины Харати. Том 1. 320 стр. Тираж: 3000. ;
 Золотые пластины Харати. Том 2. 320 стр. Тираж: 180000. ;
 От кого мы произошли? Часть I Встреча с мастером (1999);
 От кого мы произошли? Часть II. Что сказали тибетские ламы (1999);
 От кого мы произошли? Часть III Мир сложнее, чем мы думали (1999);
 Загадочная аура России. 400 стр. ;
 Матрица жизни на Земле. 624 стр. Тираж: 2500;
 В объятиях Дракулы. 392 стр. Тираж: 5000;
 Путеводитель по загадочным местам планеты. (Э. Мулдашев, Н. Зятьков). Тираж 4000. , .

Critical Publications of Muldashev 

 Балашевич Л. И. Трансгималайский сказочник с точки зрения ученого-офтальмолога // Здравый смысл. — No. 27. — 2003;
 
 
 Тревогин П. (кандидат технических наук) От кого мы произошли?" // журнал «Наука — это жизнь!»;
 Древние пирамиды в Колорадо?.., Илья Трейгер;
 И снова колорадские пирамиды!, Илья Трейгер.

References 

Pseudohistorians
Russian surgeons
Russian ophthalmologists
Russian writers
1948 births
Living people
Soviet surgeons
Soviet ophthalmologists